Talwaithe is a 1981 play-by-mail fantasy role-playing game moderated by Eric M. Bram.

Gameplay
Talwaithe was a fantasy role-playing game in which the ship Talwaithe crash-landed on a planet where the fruit is deadly to some but gives superhuman abilities to others, and encounter creatures such as goblins and dwarves.

Reception
W.G. Armintrout reviewed Talwaithe in The Space Gamer No. 60. Armintrout commented that "Talwaithe may be small, but is high-quality and fully professional. I give it a hearty recommendation."

References

Fantasy role-playing games
Play-by-mail games